Beartooth Basin Ski Area is a ski area in the western United States in northern Wyoming, located at Beartooth Pass in the Shoshone National Forest near the Montana border. It is the only ski area in North America that is only open in the summer, generally from late May through early July, since U.S. Route 212 (Beartooth Highway) is closed in winter.

The north-facing slopes of Beartooth Basin are served by two platter lifts, and there is no day lodge. Parking is alongside the highway at the pass, slightly above the summit of the ski area.

References

External links
 

Ski areas and resorts in Montana
Ski areas and resorts in Wyoming